Allan "Seapa" Mustafa (born 29 September 1985) is a British actor, comedian and writer who is best known for portraying Anthony "MC Grindah" Zografos in the BBC mockumentary series People Just Do Nothing, which he co-created with Asim Chaudhry.

Early life
Mustafa is of Kurdish and Czech descent. He grew up in the town of Chessington and worked at Chessington World of Adventures in his teenage years. He was arrested in London at 14 for graffiti.

Career
At university, Mustafa met Hugo Chegwin, Steve Stamp and Asim Chaudhry, with whom he created YouTube mockumentary videos about a fictional pirate radio station. This led to the group being commissioned for People Just Do Nothing, a BBC mockumentary about West London pirate radio station Kurupt FM. The pilot aired on BBC iPlayer in July 2012. The show ran for five series, winning a BAFTA and a Royal Television Society Award. In 2019, production began on a feature length adaptation of the series called People Just Do Nothing: Big in Japan. The film was positively received by both fans and critics.

Mustafa appeared in the 2020 Netflix film Love Wedding Repeat as Chaz, the boyfriend of Freida Pinto’s character Amanda.

Mustafa starred for two series of the BBC Radio 4 sitcom Ability as the "useless carer" Bob, for the character played by comedian Lee Ridley, who also wrote the series.

In 2022, he starred in the Channel 4 series The Curse, and the BBC Three series Peacock.

Filmography

References 

1985 births
Living people
21st-century English comedians
21st-century English male actors
English male rappers
Comedians from London
Male actors from London
British people of Kurdish descent
English people of Czech descent